Kim Sung-kyu (born April 28, 1989), referred to as Sunggyu or Sungkyu, is a South Korean singer and actor. He is the leader and main vocalist of South Korean boy band Infinite.

In November 2012, Kim began his solo career with his first extended play, Another Me, which debuted at number one on the Gaon Album Chart. His second extended play, 27 (2015), debuted at number one on the Gaon Album Chart and number eight on the US Billboard World Albums chart, and yielded two South Korean top-ten singles "The Answer" and "Kontrol".

Early life
Kim Sung-kyu was born on April 28, 1989 in Jeonju, South Korea. He attended Jeonju National University High School and was in the school rock band called "Coma Beat". When Kim first told his parents about his dream to become a singer, they rejected it because they wanted him to have a normal life and told him they'd rather he leave the house instead. He continued to practice in secret and came to Seoul alone to pursue his dreams after graduating from high school.

In 2007, he auditioned for SM Entertainment but failed to make the cut, and auditioned once more in 2008 only to fail again. Due to his admiration for rock band Nell, he initially auditioned at Woollim Entertainment under the recommendation of Nell's manager whom he'd met coincidentally at the café where he worked at part-time. With a hurting stomach, Kim went to his audition and lightly threatened them by saying, "If you don't pick me, you're going to regret it." Afterwards he rushed to the hospital immediately and got an appendectomy. On the day of his release, he received the notification that he had passed his audition. Originally intending to pursue rock music in a band, Kim instead became a trainee for the dance group Infinite, of which he would later assume the positions of leader and main vocalist. Despite being criticized by his school friends, he believed that it was an opportunity nonetheless and persisted. In 2010, Kim finally made his debut with Infinite on June 9.

On February 15, 2013 SKim graduated from Daekyung University's Practical Music program and received along with members L, Sungyeol, Hoya, and Dongwoo, the 'Proud Daekyung University Student Award' in hopes that the group would continue to grow and bring prestige to the school. The members had been accepted through a special screened admittance in early 2011. Kim was a student of Practical Music at Hoseo University.

Career

2010–2011: Debut with Infinite and solo activities

Kim made his debut as the leader and main vocalist of South Korean boyband Infinite in 2010. The group officially debuted on June 9, 2010. In the same years, he was featured in Epik High's music video "Run" along with fellow members Woohyun, Sungyeol, L, and Sungjong.

Kim along with Infinite members Lee Sung-yeol and Lee Sung-jong became the special DJs for Super Junior's Kiss the Radio while Super Junior's Leeteuk and Eunhyuk were away. They were in charge of the radio broadcast from October 24 to the 30th in 2011.

Kim and other members of Infinite dubbed the children's cartoon Wara Store from December 27, 2011 to March 27, 2012 as themselves.

2012–2014: Solo debut and Solo activities

Kim made his debut as a musical actor, along with band member Woohyun, in the musical "Gwanghwamun Sonata". Kim plays the role of Jiyong, the son of the female lead. The musical lasted from January 3 until March 11, 2012.

In May 2012, it was announced that Kim would join Immortal Songs 2 as a fixed member alongside Super Junior's Ryeowook. His first performance on the show was aired on June 23. In July, it was announced that he would be leaving the show due to Infinite's overseas promotions. His final episode on the show aired on August 25.

Kim released his solo EP, Another Me on November 19. Nell's Kim Jongwan gave his composed "Shine" to Kim as a gift for his pre-release, which was released on November 7. Kim also composed the lead single "60 Seconds" with Sweetune and personally participated in writing the lyrics for the track "41 Days". L starred as the main character on the music video. Kim made a short promotion period of three weeks, and the album became the top selling physical album for the month of November with 62,958 copies sold. The album peaked at No. 22 with an album sales record of 70,552 copies on Gaon Chart's yearly physical album chart for 2012. In 2013, the album managed to be in the Monthly Top 100 Gaon album sales and at the end of the year recording 13,283 copies. Within the year 2014, the album's additional sales were 6,098 copies. Since its release until March 2015, the total albums sold was 91,212 copies.

In January 2013, Kim was confirmed to be a fixed cast on JTBC Lee Soo-geun and Kim Byung-man's High Society 2 along with Super Junior's Shindong. The show was aired from February 9 to June 15.

In February 2013, Kim was confirmed to have made a cameo appearance in KBS's new sitcom A Bit of Love alongside four other idols, MBLAQ's G.O, KARA's Seungyeon, ZE:A's Siwan, and SECRET's Ji Eun. According to representatives, they'll appear as the younger versions of the five main characters for about three weeks. Kim played the younger version of Lee Hoon.

In April 2013, Kim joined tvN's new reality program, The Genius: Rules of the Game.

In addition, Kim was also featured in KBS2's new variety show "The Sea I Wanted", which told the story of six men's travel and experience in the open sea. The show is initially planned for a three-episode pilot with the first episode airing on September 11.
In October 2013, he made the first featuring since debut in rapper Kanto's debut single What You Want.

In 2014, Kim was cast in the musical VAMPIRE along with Super Junior's Sungmin and F.T. Island's Lee Hong-gi.

2015–2017: Solo comeback and television roles
On January 29, 2015, Kim was confirmed to star in new KBS variety show, Fluttering India, along with EXO's Suho, CNBLUE's Jonghyun, Super Junior's Kyuhyun, TVXQ's Changmin, and SHINee's Minho.

Kim released his second EP, 27 on May 11 which was produced by Nell's Kim Jong-wan.
He was promoted double lead singles "The Answer" and "Kontrol" for which the music video were released on May 11. As of June 2015, the album has sold over 75 thousand copies locally.

On May 15, 2015, Kim and L with other artists such as Exo, Girl's Day, Sistar, Niel and Ailee sang the theme song for KBS1 Special Program 'I Am Korea', titled "The Day We Met", for Gwangbok's 70th Anniversary".

He was also cast in the musical In The Heights, along with bandmate Dongwoo (cast as the male lead 'Usnavi'). Kim played the main role 'Benny' with EXO's Chen and actor Seo Kyung-soo. The musical was produced by SM C&C, a subsidiary of SM Entertainment, and ran from September 4 to November 22 at 'Blue Square'.

On September 17, 2015, it was revealed that Kim would star in a new KBS series, Youth Express, alongside comedian Kim Sook and actor Park Jaemin.

In June 2016, he hosted JTBC's variety show Girl Spirit with comedian Jo Se-ho. The program aired on July 19.

In February 2017, he was confirmed as an MC for Channel A's variety show Singderella. It was later reported that he'd sustained a rib injury while filming the programme which ultimately led to the delay of Infinite's comeback.

August 2017 marked the release of "Drama" by R&B producer Primary featuring Kim, which topped multiple domestic charts.

Kim held solo fan meetings in cities such as Tokyo and Osaka in September 2017 and also had fan meetings in November in Taipei. 2000 tickets were sold out within 1 minute for the fan meet in Taipei, which prompted organisers to add another session on the same day of November 19, 2017.

2018–2020: First full album solo comeback, concert, theatre play performance, and military enlistment
On January 25, 2018, it was announced that Kim will be participating in his first play, Amadeus, taking on the role of Mozart.

On February 26, 2018, Kim returned as a solo artist with his first full album, 10 Stories. The album was well received and its lead single, "True Love", garnered wins on two music shows and topped domestic chart. The album was also ranked ninth on Billboard's world album charts for the week ending March 10.

On March 29, 2018, Kim announced his first solo concert "Shine", which took place from May 5–7, 2018 in Seoul. The tickets for all three concert days were sold out within 3 minutes. More seats were added to all three days one day before the concert. On the last day of his solo concert, Kim made the surprise announcement that he is enlisting into the military on May 14, 2018. He served as an active duty soldier for the 22nd Division Infantry "Yulgok" located in the Goseong area (North Eastern part of South Korea). On July 3, 2018, it was announced that Kim would be starring in a military musical ‘Shinheung Military Academy’. On September 8, 2019, it was announced that Kim will be in the military musical ‘Return: The Promise of the Day’.

Kim completed his military service on January 8, 2020, and held a mini-fanmeeting following his discharge.

On December 14, 2020, Kim made his solo comeback with his third EP, Inside Me, and its lead single "I'm Cold".

2021–present: Departure from Woollim
On March 1, Kim chose not to renew his contract and left Woollim Entertainment on March 6. However, he remains a member of Infinite. After his departure, he released his first single album Won't Forget You and its lead single "Hush" on March 29 as his last work under Woollim.

On June 14, 2021, Kim signed with DoubleH TNE, a subsidiary of NHN & MLD Entertainment, after the expiration of his contract with his former agency.

On February 28, 2022, Kim announced his fourth solo concert "2022 Kim Sung Kyu Concert 'LV'(Light & Voice)", which took place from April 22-24, 2022 at Jamsil Indoor Stadium in Seoul. On April 18, 2022, Kim announced a domestic tour including the previously mentioned Seoul concert and further concerts taking place in Busan (June 4-5, 2022) and Daegu (June 11-12, 2022).

On April 22, 2022, Kim released his fourth EP, Savior, and its lead single of the same name.

In November 2022 Kim held a fan meeting (KIMSUNGKYU 10th ANNIVERSARY FANMEETING) to celebrate the 10th anniversary of his solo debut at the Jamsil Student Gymnasium on November 13.

Discography

Studio albums

Live albums

Extended plays

Single albums

Singles

As lead artist

As featured artist

Other charted songs

Songwriting credits

Filmography

Film

Dramas

Television shows

Web shows

Music videos

Theater

Tours

Concert Tour

Shine Tour (2018)

Shine Encore Tour (2020)

Light & Voice Tour (2022)

Concert LV (2023)

Fan Meetings

Awards and nominations

Notes

References

External links

1989 births
Living people
People from Jeonju
South Korean pop singers
South Korean male idols
South Korean pop rock singers
South Korean male singers
Japanese-language singers of South Korea
South Korean male musical theatre actors
South Korean male television actors
South Korean male voice actors
Infinite (group) members
Melon Music Award winners